Sarah Bettles (born 16 October 1992) is a British archer competing in women's recurve events. She won the gold medal in the women's recurve team event at the 2019 European Games held in Minsk, Belarus. She also competed in the women's individual recurve event. Earlier in 2019, she won the bronze medal in the women's team recurve event at the World Archery Championships held in 's-Hertogenbosch, Netherlands.

In 2021, she represented Great Britain at the 2020 Summer Olympics in Tokyo, Japan. She competed in the women's individual, women's team and mixed team events.

References

External links 
 

Living people
1992 births
People from Harold Wood
British female archers
World Archery Championships medalists
Archers at the 2019 European Games
European Games gold medalists for Great Britain
European Games medalists in archery
Olympic archers of Great Britain
Archers at the 2020 Summer Olympics
20th-century British women
21st-century British women